Club Sport Patria is a football club based in Guayaquil, Ecuador. Patria was one of the first football clubs founded in Ecuador and right now it is the oldest team in existence in the country.

History

The birth of Patria goes back to the year 1906 when a group of young men from the Atarazana neighborhood in Guayaquil got together and decided to create a sports club. They initially called their group simply as "Guayaquil". Two years later they got together once again, but this time they decided to make their club official and that is how the Club Sport Patria was born on September 18, 1908.

Mr. Agustín Febres-Cordero Tyler one of the club's original founders declared that the first fields where the team ever played were the streets of Guayaquil, some of them now very important streets in the city like the 9 de Octubre Avenue now one of the busiest streets in the city.

In 1958 and 1959, this team was unbeatable. They were a team to fear in the Ecuadorian league. They were considered a luxury squad.
The starting line up included: Sotomayor, Ezio Martinez, Carlos Mendez, Jorge Iza Aguirre, Sierra, Jaime Galarza, Mario Saetero, Colon Merizalde, Gambina, Enrique Raymundi, San Re.

LIST OF CLUB SPORT PATRIA'S ORIGINAL FOUNDERS

Agustín Febres Cordero Tyler
Agustín Dillon Valdez
Marcos Plaza Sotomayor
César Coronel Espinoza
Alfredo Ycaza Cucalón
Alberto Arrarte Crosby
Armando Pareja Coronel
Adolfo Baquerizo Roca
Octavio Baquerizo Roca
Eduardo Pérez Medina
Gustavo Ycaza Cucalón
Juan Medina Unamuno
Martín Reimberg Tyler
Francisco Gómez Ycaza
Uriel Valdez Castillo
José Santiago Castillo Castillo
Rodrigo Ycaza Cornejo
Fausto Gómez Terán
César Chiriboga Benítez
Gustavo Gómez Ycaza
Carlos Chiriboga Benítez
Manuel Eduardo Castillo Castillo
Juan Vallarino C.
Luis Espinoza Tamayo

Achievements
Campeonato Ecuatoriano de Fútbol Primera A
Runner-up (1): 1961
Campeonato Segunda Categoría, Zona Guayas
Champion (1): 2006
Campeonato Profesional de Guayaquil
Champion (2): 1958, 1959
Runner-up (3):1951, 1952, 1954
Campeonato Amateur del Guayas
Champion (2): 1942, 1944
Copa AsoGuayas
Champion (1): 2007

References

External links
Patria's Official Website

Association football clubs established in 1908
Patria, Club Sport
1908 establishments in Ecuador